Marc Ryan Tan Wei Ming (born 18 January 2002) is a Singaporean professional footballer who plays as a left-winger, right-winger or right-midfielder for Singapore Premier League club Tampines Rovers. He is the son of former Singapore International footballer, Steven Tan.

Club career

Early career
Marc, together with 4 other boys, impressed West Ham's academy coaches, who conducted a training camp for about 25 youth footballers in Singapore in November 2015. They later went on trials and trainings with English clubs such as Wolverhampton Wanderers, Stoke City, Charlton Athletic FC and West Ham academy teams in 2016. The attacker models his game on Chile international Alexis Sánchez and England star Raheem Sterling.

Young Lions
Marc signed with the Young Lions in 2019. However, he did not make his debut in the 2019 season. Marc made his professional debut on March 11, 2020 in a 3-0 lost against Geylang International. He was named in Goal Singapore's 2020 NxGn list as one of the country's biggest talents shortly after.

Personal life
Tan was born on 18 January 2002 in Singapore and is the son of Singaporean footballing legend Steven Tan.
He attended Maris Stella High School and Singapore Sports School before studying in Temasek Polytechnic. His father is currently the head coach of the Temasek Polytechnic's football team.

Career statistics

Club
. Caps and goals may not be correct.

Young Lions are ineligible for qualification to AFC competitions in their respective leagues.

International

U16 International caps

U16 International goals

References

External links

2002 births
Living people
Singaporean footballers
Singapore Premier League players
Singaporean sportspeople of Chinese descent
Association football forwards
Young Lions FC players
Singapore youth international footballers